Scott Tiffoney (born 26 August 1998) is a Scottish professional footballer who plays as a winger for Partick Thistle in the Scottish Championship. Tiffoney has previously played for Greenock Morton, Clyde and Ayr United, and started his career in the youth system at St Mirren.

Career

Morton
Tiffoney signed a new deal in September 2016 to tie him to Morton until summer 2018.

On 10 November 2016, he joined Scottish League Two side Clyde on loan until January 2017. He returned to Morton after just six appearances for the Bully Wee.

Livingston
In August 2018, Tiffoney signed for Livingston for an undisclosed fee and was immediately loaned back to Morton until January 2019. He made his second debut for Morton on the left-wing in a defeat against Dumbarton. He joined Ayr United on loan in January 2020.

Partick Thistle (loan)
Tiffoney joined Partick Thistle on loan in March 2021, during the extended loan market for the 2020–21 Scottish League One season as a result of the temporary suspension on lower league football due to the COVID-19 pandemic. Tiffoney scored his first and second goals for the club on his league debut, in a 4-2 away win at Airdrieonians on 27 March 2021.

Partick Thistle

After a successful loan spell at the club, Tiffoney joined Partick Thistle on a two-year contract in June 2021 ahead of the upcoming 2021–22 Scottish Championship season after Partick Thistle's title-winning Scottish League One campaign in 2020–21.

Personal life
His elder brother Jonathan Tiffoney is also a footballer.

Career statistics

Honours
Partick Thistle

• Scottish League One: Winners 2020-21

Morton
SPFL Development League West: Winners 2015–16

References

External links

1998 births
Association football wingers
Clyde F.C. players
Greenock Morton F.C. players
Living people
Livingston F.C. players
Scottish footballers
Scottish Professional Football League players
Footballers from Glasgow
Ayr United F.C. players
Partick Thistle F.C. players